The original Marcos Mantis is a sports car produced by the British car company Marcos Engineering. It was formally introduced in 1968, although it appears that production was slow to start. 

Announced as being officially released for sale in England during October 1970 as a luxurious 2+2 with a top speed of  - powered by a Triumph 2.5 PI engine / transmission and built using a fiberglass body placed on a square tube chassis – with coil springs all round and live axle rear suspension with trailing links and a “A” bracket – the Mantis was expected to be priced into the English “young executive market” at a price of A$6,500. 

No production is known to have happened in Australia, though a few early models were reported to have been privately imported into that country.   

In February 1971, Marcos announced that the car could also be purchased in component form, at a domestic market price of £425, compared to the recommended retail price of £3,185 for the built version.  Compared to this, a V8 Rover 3500 with a UK sticker price, including sales taxes, of £2,150 at the time. 32 samples were produced, with production ending in 1971.
 
The Mantis /ˈmæn.tɪs/ name has been used subsequently for models bearing little obvious similarity to the original model. Introduced in 1997, the Mantis GT is a higher performance version of the Mantis.

References

Mantis GT